Yurumanguí is an extinct language that was spoken along the Yurumanguí River of Colombia. It is known only through a short list of words and phrases recorded by Father Christoval Romero and given by him to Captain Sebastián Lanchas de Estrada, who included them in the report of his travels of 1768. Thereafter the language and its speakers disappear from the historical record.

Father Romero's word list was discovered in the archives and published, with analysis and commentary, by Rivet (1942), who argued that the language was a member of the Hokan language family. This claim is considered poor and unconvincing; a critique is given by Poser (1992). Swadesh (1963) saw connections with Opaye and Chamicura (Maipurean). Adelaar notes similarities with Esmeralda (Takame). However, it is generally considered unclassifiable due to the paucity of data.

Varieties
Loukotka (1968) included a number of purported languages from the same region in a Yurimangui stock in his language classification.  These are Timba, Lili (at Cali), Yolo/Paripazo, Jamundi, and Puscajae/Pile.  However, he notes that nothing is known of any of them. Their locations were:

Timba - Canambre River
Lili - around Cali
Yolo (Paripazo) - San Joaquín River
Jamundi - Cauca River
Puscajae (Pile) - left bank of the Dagila River

Vocabulary
Below are selected entries from the 1768 Yurumanguí vocabulary given in Ortiz (1946), with original Spanish glosses and translated English glosses.

Bibliography 
Loukotka, Čestmír (1968) Classification of South American Indian Languages. University of California, Los Angeles.
Ortiz, Sergio Elias (1946) Los Indios Yurumanguíes. Boletín de Historia y Antigüedades XXXII.731-748.
Poser, William J. (1992) The Salinan and Yurumanguí Data in Language in the Americas. International Journal of American Linguistics 58.2.202-22. PDF
Rivet, Paul (1942) Un dialecte Hoka Colombien: le Yurumangí. Journal de la Société des Américanistes de Paris 34.1-59.

References

Extinct languages of South America
Language isolates of South America
Languages of Colombia
Indigenous languages of the Americas
Languages attested from the 18th century